A Bailar is the debut studio album by Argentine singer Lali, first released on 21 March 2014.

The album peaked at No. 5 in Argentina, where it was certified gold by the Argentine Chamber of Phonograms and Videograms Producers (CAPIF). For the 2015 Gardel Awards, A Bailar won in the categories for "Best New Pop Artist Album" and "Best Female Pop Album".

Espósito embarked on a concert tour to promote the album, A Bailar Tour. It was highly successful in South America.

Singles
Espósito released "A Bailar" as the lead single on 12 August 2013. The single was a success in Argentina and Latin America. In 2014, the song won in the category for "Favorite Latin Song" at the Kids' Choice Awards Argentina and for "Best Female Music Video" at the Quiero Awards.

"Asesina", was released on 29 October 2013 as a promotional single of the album and it was released on 10 March 2014 as the second single off the album. The song is a hip-hop/pop genre song. It won the Quiero Award for "Best Choreography".

In November 2014 Espósito performed "Mil Años Luz" at Susana Giménez, which was released as the third single of A Bailar the same night. The music video is a multi-angle live performance at Teatro Opera Allianz in Buenos Aires. The song won in the category for "Favorite Song" at the 2015 Kids' Choice Awards Argentina.

After signing with Sony Music Argentina, Espósito released her fourth single on 7 January 2015 by releasing a lyric video for "Del Otro Lado". The song is a ballad about a couple's misfortunes. A music video was released on 10 March 2015, a year after the "Asesina" music video.

"Histeria" was released on 11 September 2015 as A Bailar'''s fifth and last single along with the music video. The song marks the album's highest charting single as it peaked at No. 3 on the Argentina Los 40 Principales and at No. 2 in Paraguay.

Promotional singles
"Amor de Verdad" was released as the first promotional single from A Bailar and it served to promote the deluxe edition of the album. Espósito performed the song a days before its release at the A Bailar Tour, but the song premiered on 9 December 2014 along with A Bailar fanpack edition. The track is included as extra material along with "A Bailar (Triplex Remix)" and the DVD, but it was digital released in single way, separated from the album. The song also provides uncredited vocals by Argentine rapper Zetta Krome.

Promotion
In 2014, Espósito performed "A Bailar" and "Asesina" at the ninth season of Bailando por un Sueño. In the same year, the singer performed "Mil Años Luz" at Susana Giménez and "Del Otro Lado at The U-Mix Show. In 2015, she performed "Mil Años Luz" at the tenth edition of Bailando por un Sueño's season premiere and also, at the 2015 Gardel Awards. Espósito first live performance of "Histeria" was at the Kids' Choice Awards Argentina 2015, where she also performed "Mil Años Luz". In December, 2015 Espósito performed "Histeria" and "A Bailar" at the tenth edition of Bailando por un Sueño's season finale.

Tour

Espósito began a worldwide tour on 19 April 2014 to promote A Bailar'' due to its international success. The tour included stops throughout Argentina, Uruguay, Spain, Italy and Israel.

Awards

Track listing

Note
Songwriting credits extracted from SADAIC official website.

Charts performance

Monthly charts

Certifications

Release history

References 

2014 albums
Lali Espósito albums
Spanish-language albums
Sony Music Argentina albums